The Carlos Palanca Memorial Awards for Literature winners in the year 1981 (rank/prize, 
title of winning entry, name of author).


English division
Novel
Grand prizes (co-winners): "Mass" by F. Sionil Jose and "Sangria Tomorrow" by Wilfrido D. Nolledo

Short story
First prize: "In Hog Heaven" by Jessie B. Garcia
Second prize: "The Party Hopper" by Luning Bonifacio
Third prize: "In These Hallowed Halls" by Jesus Q. Cruz

Poetry
First prize: "Poems" by Edel Garcellano
Second prizes: "15 Poems" by Jose M. Lansang Jr. and "Pacific" by Samuel Peralta
Third prizes: "It is Autumn in China and Am Far Away from Home" by Cesar Mella and "Selected Poems" by Simeon Dumdum, Jr.

Essay
First prize: "Philippine Poetics: The Past Eight Years" by Cirilo F. Bautista
Second prize: "Fifteen Days in the Life of Jun San Juan, Filipino, Member of the Family of Man" by Jesus S.M. Dimapilis
Third prize: "The Aglipay Question" by Alfredo N. Salanga

One-act play
First prize: "Sacraments of the Dead" by Tony Perez
Second prize: "Penumbra" by Dong Delos Reyes
Third prizes: "Abattoir" by Leoncio P. Deriada and "The Players" by Alfredo O. Cuenca Jr.

Full-length play
Special prize: "Gateau La Sans Rival ..." by Lemuel Torrevillas

Filipino (Tagalog) division
Novel in Filipino
Special prize: "Mga Tinapay sa Ibabaw ng Tubig" by Reynaldo A. Duque

Short story in Filipino
First prize: "Di Ko Masilip Ang Langit" by Benjamin P. Pascual
Second prizes: "Ambos ng Bayan" by Rosario Balmaceda-Gutierrez and "Sulat Mula Sa Libon" by Generoso Taduran Jr.
Third prize: "May Hatid na Subyang ang Hangin at Ulan" by Lamberto E. Antonio

Poetry in Filipino
First prize: "Taga sa Bato" by Romulo Sandoval
Second prize: "Lagi na'y Kailangan Kong Gumising nang Maaga't iba pang Pagdidili-dili" by Tomas F. Agulto
Third prize: "Kaya Bang Ipiit at Saka Tanuran ang Isang Gunita" by Benigno R. Juan

Essay in Filipino
First prizes: "Ang Kuwento ng Nawawalang Ilog" by Wilfredo Pa. Virtusio and "Sa Sariling Panunuring Pampanitikan- Mga Hamon at Pananagutan" by Pedro L. Ricarte
Second prize: "Hagkis ni Lamberto E. Antonio: Ang Tula Bilang Sandatang Pampulitika" by Romulo Sandoval and "Paano Nagsusulat ang Isang Ina" by Ligaya Tiamson-Rubin
Third prizes: "Ang Manlalakbay" by Ernesto Cabling and "Talababa sa Kontemporaryong Dula" by Reuel Molina Aguila

One-act play in Filipino
First prize: "May Isang Sundalo" by Rene O. Villanueva
Second prize: "Barkada" by Bienvenido Noriega Jr.
Third prize: "Ganito Bang Lahat Ang Tatay" by Mariano Calangasan

Full-length play in Filipino
First prize: "Mga Idolong Romantiko sa Isang Dulang Sumusuri ng Lipunan" by Bienvenido Noriega Jr.
Second prize: "Juan Luna" by Bienvenido Noriega Jr.
Third prize: "Anghel" by Noel De Leon

More winners by year

References

 

1981
Palanca Awards, 1981